Zir Barandud (also Romanized as Zīr Barandūd, Zīr-e Barandūd, and Zīr-i-Barandūd; also known as Zīrandūd, Barandūd, and Zīr Banāndūd) is a village in Qohestan Rural District, Qohestan District, Darmian County, South Khorasan Province, Iran. At the 2006 census, its population was 244, in 66 families.

References 

Populated places in Darmian County